Emily Viner is an Australian mountain bike orienteer. She won a silver medal in the long distance at the 2002 World MTB Orienteering Championships, placed fourth in the sprint, and fifth in the relay with the Australian team.

References

External links
 
 Emily Viner at World of O Runners

Australian orienteers
Female orienteers
Australian female cyclists
Mountain bike orienteers
Living people
Place of birth missing (living people)
Year of birth missing (living people)
21st-century Australian women